"Make Them Wheels Roll" is a song by Australian electronic music group Safia. It was released as the second single from their debut studio album, Internal (2016).

The song premiered on Triple J on 4 March 2016. Ben Woolner said the song is about "How you're encouraged to be part of society to keep things going." He added, "it's definitely up there with one of the favourite tracks we've done." The song was released on 4 March 2016.

Music video
The music video for "Make Them Wheels Roll" was released on YouTube on 19 April 2016. It was directed by Jimmy Ennett.

Critical reception
Zanda Wilson from Music Feeds said; "'Make Them Wheels Roll' is everything you’ve come to expect and love from Ben and the boys; just the right amount of catchy pop, mixed in with effortless amounts of funk and sinfully delicious soul."

Charts
In Australia, "Make Them Wheels Roll" debuted at number 77 on the ARIA singles chart for the week commencing 14 March 2016, later peaking at number 45 and becoming the band's first top 50 song as a solo act. The song also debuted at number 13 on ARIA Australian Artist chart.

Weekly charts

Certifications

References

Safia (band) songs
2016 singles
2016 songs
Parlophone singles